Javier Aparicio Gómez (born 8 March 2000), commonly known as Apa, is a Spanish professional footballer who plays for Real Valladolid B as a right back.

Club career
Born in Palencia, Castile and León, Apa joined Real Valladolid's youth setup in 2015, from Club Internacional de la Amistad. On 7 May 2017, aged just 17, he made his senior debut with the reserves by coming on as a half-time substitute in a 1–4 home loss against Cultural y Deportiva Leonesa in the Segunda División B championship.

On 13 April 2018, after becoming a regular starter for the B-side, Apa extended his contract until 2020. He made his first team debut on 6 December 2018, starting in a 2–1 home win against RCD Mallorca, for the season's Copa del Rey.

References

External links

2000 births
Living people
People from Palencia
Sportspeople from the Province of Palencia
Spanish footballers
Footballers from Castile and León
Association football defenders
Segunda División B players
Real Valladolid Promesas players
Real Valladolid players